"Victory or death" and its equivalents, is used as a motto or battle cry.

Military
 A boxer Agathos Daimon died in ancient Olympia aged 35, having promised Zeus  ("victory or death"). 
 The Bedford Flag, possibly the oldest extant battle flag of the American Revolution, bears the motto  ("To conquer or die")
Before Washington's crossing of the Delaware River at the Battle of Trenton in 1776, "Victory" was the password and "Or Death" was the response.
The Maniots used "Victory or Death" as their motto when they joined the Greek War of Independence against the Ottoman Empire in 1821.
 The letter written by commander William Barret Travis "To the People of Texas & All Americans in the World" during the Battle of the Alamo (1836), ends with "Victory or Death!".
 Adolf Hitler gave the order "Victory or Death" twice:
 to Erwin Rommel at the Second Battle of El Alamein (1942);
 to Friedrich Paulus at the Battle of Stalingrad (1942–3).
 The 32nd Armor Regiment of the United States Army has the motto "Victory or Death" .
 The 1960 film G.I. Blues features the regimental emblem as Elvis Presley had served with them in 1958–60.
 The 1986 film Ferris Bueller's Day Off features a black beret bearing the regiment's emblem.
 Axl Rose of Guns N' Roses has the regiment's emblem and motto tattooed on his left arm.
 The 442 Field Artillery Battalion of the US Army have the motto Victoria laeta aut mors ("Glorious victory or death")
 The Chilean Navy has the motto Vencer o Morir ("Victory or Death" in spanish).
 It was used as a battle cry in medieval Muslim battles and conquests.
It is the name of a gun battery on the main gun deck of the U.S.S. Constitution.

Heraldic motto
It is given as the translation of the heraldic motto of several Irish clans and Scottish clans :
 Clan Gallagher - Buaidh nó Bás ("Victory or death")
 Clan MacDougall – Buaidh no bas ("Victory or death")
 Clan MacNeil – Buaidh no bas ("Victory or death")
 Clan Macdowall –  ("To conquer or die")
 Clan Maclaine of Lochbuie –  ("To conquer or die")
 Clan McCabe –  ("To conquer or die")
 Irish clan Murphy of Wexford and Cork uses  ("To conquer or die")
 The Clifton family of Lytham uses
 ("Death or victory")

In fiction
 In Mass Effect the Krogan word "korbal" is roughly translated to "Victory or Death".
 In the 1984 film The Last Starfighter, the phrase is chanted by the starfighters.
 In the Warcraft universe, "Lok'tar ogar!" (Victory or Death!) is the battlecry of the Horde.
 In Hearthstone, it is said by Garrosh in the beginning of games.
 In Guild Wars, "Victory or Death" was the name of a skill in Guild versus Guild battles.  In Guild Wars 2, it is the title of the final story quest.
 In Warhammer 40,000, "Victorus aut Mortis" is the war cry of the Raven Guard chapter of Space Marines.
 In the 2001 film Enemy at the Gates and 2003 video game Call of Duty, "Victory or Death" is a common slogan for Red Army Political Commissars.
 A commercial for the last episode of the final season of the animated series Samurai Jack mentions this phrase.
 In Voltron: Legendary Defender, "Victory of Death" is one of the two war cries of the Galra.
 The final episode of Star Wars: The Clone Wars is named after this expression.

See also
 Victory
 Death
 Death or Glory (disambiguation)

References

Mottos
Victory